Thomas Hutchinson Williams (23 May 1899–1960) was an English footballer who played in the Football League for Ashington, Bristol City, Bristol Rovers, Charlton Athletic, Clapton Orient, Gillingham, Merthyr Town and Norwich City.

References

1899 births
1960 deaths
English footballers
Association football forwards
English Football League players
Ryhope Colliery Welfare F.C. players
Huddersfield Town A.F.C. players
Leyton Orient F.C. players
Charlton Athletic F.C. players
Gillingham F.C. players
Ashington A.F.C. players
Mid Rhondda F.C. players
Bristol Rovers F.C. players
Bristol City F.C. players
Merthyr Town F.C. players
Norwich City F.C. players
Easington Colliery A.F.C. players